The 2017 Wellington Sevens was the eighteenth edition of the Wellington Sevens tournament, and the third tournament of the 2016–17 World Rugby Sevens Series. The tournament was played on 28–29 January 2017 at Westpac Stadium in Wellington, New Zealand.

Format
Sixteen teams are drawn into four pools of four teams each. Each team plays everyone in their pool once. The top two teams from each pool advance to the Cup quarterfinals. The bottom two teams from each group go to the Challenge Trophy quarterfinals.

Teams
The fifteen core teams were joined by Papua New Guinea, who qualified via the 2016 Oceania Sevens, for this tournament.

Pool Stage

Pool A

Pool B

Pool C

Pool D

Knockout stage

13th place

Challenge Trophy

5th Place

Cup

Tournament placings

Source: World Rugby (archived)

References

External links
World Rugby Sevens Series website

2017
2016–17 World Rugby Sevens Series
2017 in New Zealand rugby union
January 2017 sports events in New Zealand